Mountain Ridge High School is a public high school in Herriman, Utah. It serves students in grades 10-12 for the Jordan School District.

History 
The intent to build the school was announced by the Jordan School District in 2016. Ground was broken in 2017. The school cost $82 million to build.

Mountain Ridge High School opened in the fall of 2019.

Athletics 
Mountain Ridge participates in sports sanctioned by the Utah High School Activities Association. The school's nickname is the Sentinels. The school competes in Region 7 of class 6A and the colors are scarlet red, gray, and white. The following sports are offered:

Baseball (boys)
Basketball (girls & boys)
Cross Country (girls & boys)
Football (boys)
Golf (girls & boys)
Lacrosse (girls & boys)
Soccer (girls & boys)
Softball (girls)
Tennis (girls & boys)
Track & Field (girls & boys)
Volleyball (girls)
Wrestling (girls & boys)
Swim (co-ed)

See also 
 List of high schools in Utah

References

External links 
 
 

Public high schools in Utah
Schools in Salt Lake County, Utah